613: Ashy to Classy is the first studio album by the American hip hop duo Field Mob, released in 2000 by MCA Records. Supported by the only single, "Project Dreamz", it peaked at No. 194 on the Billboard 200 and No. 35 on the Top R&B/Hip Hop Albums charts.

Critical reception
Exclaim! wrote that "it's evident they've been influenced by the early work of Dungeon Family stalwarts Goodie Mob and OutKast as much as they have been by the usual Southern bounce, and that there's a little more to them than meets the eye." CMJ New Music Monthly praised the "muddy gothic rumble of their minimal backing tracks."

Track listing

References 

2000 debut albums
Field Mob albums
MCA Records albums